Fredrik August Dahlgren (20 September 1816 – 16 February 1895) was a Swedish writer, playwright and songwriter.

Biography
Dahlgren was born in Nordmark parish in Värmland, Sweden. He was the son of Barthold Dahlgren, the manager of the mines at Taberg, and Anna Carolina Svensson. After finishing school at Karlstads gymnasium in Karlstad, he matriculated at Uppsala University in 1834, completing a filosofie magister degree in 1839. 

In 1841 he was hired at the Ministry of Education and Ecclesiastical Affairs where he served until 1848. He served in the National Archives of Sweden from 1848. He became chancellor in 1862 and in 1871  secretary of the ecclesiastical ministry.  In 1874, Dahlgren became Acting Head of the Office for Health and Poverty Affairs and Chancellor in 1878. He was a member of the Swedish Academy (1871–1895), where he occupied seat 6.

Dahlgren is best remembered for writing two popular Swedish folk songs.  Together with Anders Fryxell (1795–1881), he wrote the lyrics to "Ack Värmeland, du sköna". He wrote the lyrics for the Värmland folk song "Jänta å ja". Dahlgren also wrote the text for the musical drama Värmlänningarna with music by composer Andreas Randel (1806–1864).

Biography
He was married to Ulrika Magdalena von Heland (1818–1900). He was the father of the historian Erik Wilhelm Dahlgren (1848–1934), who became head of the National Library of Sweden, and the writer Lotten Dahlgren (1851–1934).

Dahlgren is buried at the Norra begravningsplatsen in Stockholm.

Selected bibliography
Wermlänningarne (Värmlänningarna) - 1846
Viser på varmlanske tongmåle  - 1886

References

External links
F. A. Dahlgren on Victor Records.
Project Runeberg
Viser på varmlanske tongmåle 
F. A. Dahlgren biography in English 
Swedish lyrics
Skräddern å Skomakern 
F. A. Dahlgren poems and songs 
Song lyrics from "Värmlänningarna"
Jag sjunger och dansar from "Värmlänningarna" 
National Jukebox
Ack Värmeland, du sköna from "Värmlänningarna"
I villande skogen from "Värmlänningarna"
Gustavus Adolphus College recordings
[http://archives.gac.edu/cdm/compoundobject/collection/ScanAm/id/1647/rec/2 ''Jänta å ja] 
Skräddern å Skomakern Internet Archive'''
"Värmlänningarna" poster
F. A. Dahlgren streaming audio 
Songs of Sweden: four F. A. Dahlgren songs

1816 births
1895 deaths
People from Filipstad Municipality
 Uppsala University alumni
Swedish male writers
Writers from Värmland
Swedish songwriters
Members of the Swedish Academy
19th-century Swedish writers
19th-century male writers
Burials at Norra begravningsplatsen